Ruddy Joraider Lugo (born May 22, 1980) is a Dominican-American former professional baseball relief pitcher. He played in Major League Baseball (MLB) for the Tampa Bay Devil Rays and the Oakland Athletics. Julio Lugo, who played in MLB for 12 seasons as a shortstop, was his older brother.

Career
He attended Xaverian High School in Brooklyn, New York.

Lugo was born in Barahona, Dominican Republic, and was drafted by the Milwaukee Brewers in the third round of the 1999 Major League Baseball draft. During spring training , he was signed by the Tampa Bay Devil Rays. He then started the season with the Single-A Visalia Oaks and finished it with the Double-A Montgomery Biscuits. In , he was  called up to the Devil Rays and made his debut on April 3 against the Baltimore Orioles. In June , the Oakland Athletics claimed him off waivers.

In January , Lugo was claimed off waivers by the New York Mets. In August, Lugo was promoted to the Majors due to injuries to John Maine and Billy Wagner. After being a starter for the New Orleans Zephyrs in Triple-A, Lugo was placed in the bullpen for the Mets. However, he was optioned a few days afterward without getting into a game. He became a free agent at the end of the season and signed a minor-league contract with the Detroit Tigers.

Lugo was released by the Toledo Mud Hens in  July . He then spent the 2011 season with the independent Atlantic League Long Island Ducks as a starting pitcher. On July 4, 2013, he joined the Bridgeport Bluefish as a relief pitcher, and pitched in 25 games for the team that season.

References

External links

1980 births
Living people
Beloit Snappers players
Bridgeport Bluefish players
Carolina Mudcats players
Dominican Republic expatriate baseball players in the United States
Durham Bulls players
Jacksonville Suns players
Jupiter Hammerheads players
Long Island Ducks players
Major League Baseball pitchers
Major League Baseball players from the Dominican Republic
Montgomery Biscuits players
New Orleans Zephyrs players
Oakland Athletics players
Ogden Raptors players
People from Barahona Province
Round Rock Express players
Sacramento River Cats players
Tampa Bay Devil Rays players
Toledo Mud Hens players
Vero Beach Dodgers players
Visalia Oaks players
Wilmington Waves players
Xaverian High School alumni
Azucareros del Este players
Tigres de Aragua players
Dominican Republic expatriate baseball players in Venezuela
Toros del Este players